Jørgen Christian Thomdahl Olesen (21 January 1924 – 13 June 1999) was a Danish association football player, who played 42 games and scored two goals for the Denmark national football team. Born in Aarhus, he played his entire career as a midfielder for local club Aarhus Gymnastik Forening (AGF). He was also part of Denmark's squad at the 1952 Summer Olympics, but he did not play in any matches. He died in the Aarhus suburb Viby in June 1999, 75 years old.

References

External links
Danish national team profile
 Haslund profile
 Peders Fodboldstatistik profile

1924 births
1999 deaths
Danish men's footballers
Aarhus Gymnastikforening players
Denmark international footballers
Footballers from Aarhus
Association football midfielders